The fifth season of the American television drama series The Americans, comprising 13 episodes, aired on FX from March 7 to May 30, 2017. The show moved to Tuesdays, having aired on Wednesdays for its first four seasons.

The events of the fifth season take place between February 1984 and August 1984, shown by the reference to the TV broadcasts of the 1984 Winter Olympics in episode 1 and the coverage of Ronald Reagan's "We begin bombing in five minutes" joke in episode 13.

Cast

Main
 Keri Russell as Elizabeth Jennings (Nadezhda), a KGB officer
 Matthew Rhys as Philip Jennings (Mischa), a KGB officer
 Brandon J. Dirden as FBI agent Dennis Aderholt
 Costa Ronin as Oleg Igorevich Burov, a KGB officer
 Keidrich Sellati as Henry Jennings, Elizabeth and Philip's son
 Holly Taylor as Paige Jennings, Elizabeth and Philip's daughter
 Noah Emmerich as FBI agent Stan Beeman

Special guests
 Alison Wright as Martha Hanson

Recurring
 Frank Langella as Gabriel, the Jennings' KGB handler
 Margo Martindale as Claudia, the Jennings' replacement KGB handler
 Laurie Holden as Renee
 Danny Flaherty as Matthew Beeman, Stan's son
 Kelly AuCoin as Pastor Tim, the minister at Paige's church
 Peter Jacobson as Agent Wolfe, new head of FBI counterintelligence
 Ivan Mok as Tuan Eckert, a Vietnamese agent acting as the adopted son of the Jennings' newest cover identities 
 Alex Ozerov as Mischa Semenov, Philip and Irina's son
 Alexander Sokovikov as Alexei Morozov, a scientist and Soviet defector
 Irina Dvorovenko as Evgheniya Morozova, Alexei's wife
 Brett Tucker as Benjamin Stobert, Elizabeth's mark in Topeka  
 Zack Gafin as Pasha Morozov, Alexei and Evgheniya's son
 Darya Ekamasova as Sofia Kovalenko, a TASS employee
 Julia Garner as Kimberly "Kimmy" Breland, daughter of the head of the CIA's Afghan desk
 Boris Krutonog as Igor Burov, Oleg's father, head of the Soviet Ministry of Railways
 Snezhana Chernova as Yelena Burova, Oleg's mother
 Ravil Isyanov as Ruslan, an OBKhSS investigator
 Konstantin Lavysh as Father Andrei, a Russian Orthodox priest

Production
In May 2016, FX renewed the series for a 13-episode fifth season to air in 2017; and a sixth and final 10-episode season to air in 2018. The season began principal photography on October 11, 2016; and completed on March 13, 2017.

Episodes

Reception

Critical response
The fifth season has received widespread critical acclaim. On Rotten Tomatoes, it received a 95% approval rating with an average score of 9.09 out of 10 based on 37 reviews, with a critics consensus of: "In its penultimate season, The Americans brings long-simmering storylines to a boil while heightening the spy-thriller stakes and deepening the domestic drama—all brought vividly to life by superb performances from its veteran cast." On Metacritic, the season has a score of 94 out of 100 based on 19 reviews, indicating "universal acclaim". Matthew Gilbert of The Boston Globe gave it a highly positive review and wrote, "The drama remains as tense as ever, with strong, careful writing and an abundance of fine performances". Tim Goodman of The Hollywood Reporter also lauded the series, "It's extremely well-constructed, with slow-burning storylines that are paying off in superb dramatic depth" and praised its "top-tier acting" and "artfully crafted visuals".

In regards to the premiere, some criticisms came from Emily VanDerWerff of Vox who noted that the symbolism of "spending a long time digging a hole so deep that you probably can't escape it—while knowing you'll lose friends along the way—is a little on-the-nose", while Mike Hale of The New York Times was not very excited with the first episode's "grainy montage set to martial music that began with images of collectivist agricultural might before seguing to blighted fields and long lines outside stores." Libby Nelson of Vox thought that "the agriculture plot was the weakest link" in the second episode.

The fifth season was criticized for becoming too slow, turning the show from "slow burn" into just "warm embers". According to Fields and Weisberg, they wanted the fifth season "to feel different as it unspooled", harvesting the story pieces created in the fourth season. The fifth season was not meant as a set-up for the sixth season. With pacing of the fifth season slowed down intentionally, Weisberg and Fields admitted that they did not expect "this much of a backlash" for "hitting the brakes too hard". They were upset by criticism, but suggested waiting until the series is over, hoping for the response to become more muted in context of the sixth and final season.

Accolades
For the 33rd TCA Awards, The Americans received a nomination for Outstanding Achievement in Drama. For the 69th Primetime Emmy Awards, the series received four nominations–Matthew Rhys for Outstanding Lead Actor in a Drama Series, Keri Russell for Outstanding Lead Actress in a Drama Series, Alison Wright for Outstanding Guest Actress in a Drama Series, and Joel Fields and Joe Weisberg for Outstanding Writing for a Drama Series for "The Soviet Division".

References

External links
 
 

2017 American television seasons
Season 5
Television series set in 1984